Syromyatkino is a rural locality (a village) in Sizemskoye Rural Settlement, Sheksninsky District, Vologda Oblast, Russia. The population was 27 as of 2002.

Geography 
Syromyatkino is located 69 km north of Sheksna (the district's administrative centre) by road. Pochinok is the nearest rural locality.

References 

Rural localities in Sheksninsky District